Ken and Neal Skupski were the defending champions and successfully defended their title, defeating David O'Hare and Joe Salisbury 6–7(5–7), 6–4, [10–5] in the final.

Seeds

Draw

References
 Main Draw

Trophée des Alpilles - Doubles
2016 Trophée des Alpilles - Doubles